Maryfield can refer to:

Places 
 Rural Municipality of Maryfield No. 91, Saskatchewan
 Maryfield, Saskatchewan; village in Saskatchewan 
 Maryfield, Cornwall; hamlet in Cornwall, England
 Maryfield, Belfast, location of the Maryfield Secretariat under the Anglo-Irish Agreement (1985–98)

Other 
 Maryfield (horse), racehorse
 Maryfield Hospital; a former hospital in Dundee, Scotland

Similar spelling
 Mary Field (1909–96) American film actress